The Curwensville Area School District is a small, rural, public school district. It serves the residents of the Boroughs of Curwensville, Grampian and Lumber City and Ferguson Township, Greenwood Township, Penn Township and Pike Township in Clearfield County, Pennsylvania. According to 2000 federal census data, Curwensville Area School District serves a resident population of 7,646. In 2009, Curwensville Area School District residents’ per capita income was $14,830, while the median family income in the District was just $38,107. In the Commonwealth of Pennsylvania, the median family income was $49,501 and the United States median family income was $49,445, in 2010.

Schools
The district operates one Jr./Sr. High School, and two Elementary Schools.

Curwensville Area Junior/Senior High School
Curwensville Elementary School
Penn Grampian Elementary School

Extracurriculars
Curwensville Area School District offers a wide variety of clubs, activities and an extensive sports program. The District maintains an indoor pool which is open to the public some evenings. The Alan Fairman Community Recreation Center is also open to the public.

References

School districts in Clearfield County, Pennsylvania